Laxminiya may refer to:

Laxminiya, Janakpur, Nepal
Laxminiya, Narayani, Nepal
Laxminiya, Sagarmatha, Nepal